Odessa is a Volvo Ocean 60 yacht. She finished tenth in the W60 class of the 1993–94 Whitbread Round the World Race skippered by Anatoly Verba.

References

Volvo Ocean Race yachts
Sailing yachts of Ukraine
Volvo Ocean 60 yachts
1990s sailing yachts